The 2008 24 Hours of Le Mans was the 76th Grand Prix of Endurance, taking place on 14–15 June 2008 at the Circuit de la Sarthe, Le Mans, France, organised by the Automobile Club de l'Ouest (ACO). The test day was on June 1. The race was attended by 258,000 spectators. The Audi team's progress and victory was documented in the 2008 film Truth in 24.

Rule changes
On 20 December 2007, the ACO confirmed the previously announced rule changes for the 2008 race and 2008 Le Mans Series season. Petrol engined Le Mans Prototype cars received a 3% larger air restrictor to increase power output and to balance performance between petrol and diesel engines. The performance difference between the LMP1 and LMP2 classes will be increased by decreasing LMP1 class' minimum weight 900 kg, the LMP2 class' minimum weight increased to 825 kg, and a reduction in the fuel capacity of LMP2 cars from 90 litres to 80 litres.

The ACO also added rules regarding the types of engines and fuels which can be used. Production engines which meet the GT1 and GT2 class regulations can now be installed in LMP1 and LMP2 class cars respectively. The use of biofuels will also be allowed in the prototype categories, with petrol engines allowed to run 10% ethanol, and diesel teams allowed to use biodiesel. The GT1 and GT2 categories remained unchanged in the new rules.

Prior to the Le Mans Test Day, Audi announced that they would be the first team to adapt their cars to use 10% biodiesel as allowed by the new rules, with partner Shell developing a biomass to liquid fuel.

Entries

Automatic invitations
Automatic entry to the 2008 24 Hours of Le Mans was granted to teams that had performed well in the previous year's 24 Hours of Le Mans, as well as the 2007 seasons of the American Le Mans Series, Le Mans Series, FIA GT Championship, and the Petit Le Mans. The official list of automatic invites was published by the ACO on 16 November 2007, with confirmation of entries accepted by teams published on 18 January 2008.

List of automatic invitations

1. Due to Audi Sport North America already earning two entries, their third automatic entry was passed to the next team in the championship.

2. Due to Corvette Racing already earning two entries, their third automatic entry would have been passed to the next team in the championship. However, no team had run enough ALMS races to be counted towards the GT1 championship, leaving the invitation unassigned.

3. Vitaphone Racing initially turned down their automatic invitation due to their Maserati MC12 not complying with ACO rules. The team however reapplied for a legal Aston Martin DBR9 in the same class at a later date.

Official entry list
On 19 February, the ACO published their full list of fifty-five entries plus eight reserves, chosen from a total of 88 applications. The fifty-five main entries were required to appear at the Le Mans test day in order to compete.

Reserve entries
Eight cars were granted reserve entries. If any selected team from the main entry list withdrew, a reserve entry would take their place. On April 10, the #81 Tafel Racing Ferrari withdrew and was replaced by the #4 Saulnier Pescarolo-Judd. Although several teams withdrew their reserve entries, none of the remaining reserve entries were promoted to the primary entry list. On Tuesday, June 10, Racing Box's Lucchini-Judd failed official scrutineering and was withdrawn. The first remaining reserve, Epsilon Euskadi's second entry, was allowed to take its place at the start of Wednesday qualifying.

Test session

Drivers, team, and equipment for fifty-five cars arrived at the Circuit de la Sarthe on June 1 to participate in a mandatory test session. Drivers who had not been to the circuit in the past three runnings of the 24 Hours, or had never participated before, were required to complete ten laps of the circuit during the session, while other drivers were allowed to concentrate on setting their cars up for the race two weeks away. Two sessions were held running four hours each, with an hour break for lunch.

Rain dominated the weather during the two sessions, with the track drying out only for brief periods of time before heavy rains dampened the circuit once more. Stéphane Sarrazin, in the #8 Peugeot, was able to set the fastest lap during a brief dry period in the second session, recording a time of 3:22.222. By the end of the test day, Sarrazin's time remained unbeaten, and was in fact nearly four and a half seconds ahead of the second fastest lap, set by the #9 Peugeot. Several hundredths of a second slower still was the #1 Audi, third fastest overall. The fastest car not running a diesel engine was the #17 Pescarolo, recording a time of 3:33.939, over eleven seconds behind the overall leader. In the LMP2 class, the five cars set lap times within three seconds of one another, the Van Merksteijn Motorsport Porsche setting a 3:42.191 lap time to lead the class and place fourteenth overall in the standings. The other Porsche RS Spyder of Team Essex was second fastest, followed by the Barazi-Epsion Zytek in third.

The Grand Touring categories were led by the previous year's winner in GT1 class, the factory Aston Martin squad. The #009 DBR9 set a lap time of 3:53.531, fast enough for 25th place overall. Larbre Compétition's Saleen set the second fastest lap in the class, nearly two seconds behind. The two factory Corvettes were third and fourth, with the #64 team a few tenths faster than the #63. For the GT2 class, American teams lead the session. Risi Competizione's #82 Ferrari set a 4:05.561 lap time, only three one thousandths of a second ahead of the Flying Lizard Porsche. BMS Scuderia Italia's Ferrari completed the top three in the class, a second slower than the top two.

During the eight hours of testing, practice had to be halted four times for accidents around the circuit. During the first session, the JMB Ferrari spun and hit a wall at Arnage, requiring it to be towed from the track. The Ferrari did however return to the track several hours later after repairs. Shortly after the beginning of the second test session, the Risi-Krohn Ferrari also had a spin, impacting the wall at the Ford Chicane, leading to driver Tracy Krohn being briefly hospitalized. Less than an hour later, Marc Gené in the #7 Peugeot spun in the Karting curve and his 908 became airborne, impacting the wall heavily. Gené was hospitalized with an injured toe, and the car had to be replaced by a new chassis. The final stoppage of practice occurred in the final hour when Joey Foster impacting the wall at the Dunlop Chicane with his Embassy-Zytek.

Qualifying
Qualifying was held on 11–12 June, with two individual two-hour sessions being held each day. The first sessions were held at early dusk, while following an hour break, the second sessions ran into the darkness of night. All drivers were once again required to set a minimum of laps to prepare themselves for the circuit; three laps required in the first session, and another three laps in the night session. The best lap time from all four combined determined the starting grid.

Wednesday
Following a wet test day, qualifying began under dry conditions. The Peugeot lapped under 3:20 min, lap times reminding of that of the Porsche 917 records set in 1971, when the track had almost no chicanes, and was 120m shorter. Stéphane Sarrazin on Peugeot Nr 8 grabbed pole-position in 3:18.513, shortly followed by Franck Montagny on Peugeot Nr 9 with 3:18.862.

Thursday
The second day of qualifying will determine the final grid.

Qualifying times
Class leaders and the fastest lap time in each class on each day are in bold.  The fastest lap for each car is in gray.

Race

The race began at 3:00 pm local time (GMT+2). The three Peugeot 908 HDi FAPs led the field into the first chicane, but Allan McNish overtook the #7 Peugeot of Nicolas Minassian at the exit of the Dunlop Chicane. Minassian retook the position on the Mulsanne Straight, and the Peugeots maintained the top three positions at the end of the first lap. The Peugeots were running consistently 3 seconds a lap faster than McNish, and over 5 seconds faster than the other 2 Audis.

In the early hours, the Peugeot #8, Pole setter and only car to set a fast race lap under 3:20, by black flag had been ordered into the pits to repair the headlights. This car trailed the other Diesels by several laps. The GT2 class saw drama for the two Porsches which had been battling for the class lead, as #80 collided with the Pole setting Porsche #76. Only #77 could continue after lengthy repairs.

The situation after 12 hours was as follows: Peugeot #7 was leading, with the first five being within 2 laps, with Audi #2 in 2nd, followed by Peugeot #9, and the Audi #3 and #1. Due to the fast pace and close competition, and despite a 34-minute safety car period, the leaders had completed 200 laps after 12 hours, a pace that might have topped the laps and distances covered in 1971 and 1988 despite the track now having chicanes. In the LMP2 class, the leader was 10th overall, the two Porsches being within a lap, leading the next car by nine laps. In GT1, the leader was 15th overall, the Aston Martins and Corvettes racing head to head less than a minute apart, with six cars being within six laps. In the GT2 class, the leading Ferrari was 26th overall, with no less than five Ferraris battling for the class win which was to be expected after the two class leading Porsches had collided, and five other GT2 cars were already out.

The second half of the race was under wet conditions. Lap times of the whole field went above the 4:00 mark, with GT1 cars actually as fast as the leading diesels. The Audis were able to cope with the rain much better than the Peugeots. Kristensen was able to reel in Minassian at 8 seconds per lap. In a desperate attempt to adapt the Peugeots to the wet conditions all 3 cars were fitted with high-downforce nose and tail sections. At 5am the #2 Audi grabbed the lead and McNish was able to build the advantage to a full lap. The rain stopped and the #7 started to reel in the #2. With less than 2 hours to go the rain returned. Minassian decided to stick with slicks and as a result spun in front of the Lizard Porsche just before the Dunlop Esses. In the end, Audi and Kristensen won once again, with the highest placing Peugeot being in the same lap, but not in reach for overtaking. The six factory-entered diesels dominated the LMP1 class, having no major problems. The Porsche RS Spyders dominated the LMP2 class, posting faster lap times than several LMP1 cars.

In the GT1 class, Aston Martin Racing edged Corvette Racing for the win, placed 13th overall, both covering 344 laps with three more GT1 entrants chasing them. It was AMR's second win against stiff competition from Corvette in as many years.  Of the five Ferraris which had led the GT2 class, three made it to the finish ahead of the remaining Porsches which had been lapping slightly faster.

Of the 35 cars still running after 24 hours, only one failed to cover 70% of the 381 laps of the winner. Despite the conditions, the distance record on the current track layout, 380 laps, set in 2006, was beaten by one lap by both the #2 Audi and the #7 Peugeot.

Results
Class winners are marked in bold. Cars finishing the race but not completing 70% of the winner's distance or cars not finishing the race at the end of 24 hours (marked as DNF; regardless of distance) are listed as NC (Not Classified).

Statistics
 Fastest Lap – #8 Peugeot 908 HDI (Stéphane Sarrazin) – 3:19.394
 Average Speed – #2 Audi R10 TDI – 216.3 km/h
 Best Speed – #8 Peugeot 908 HDI-FAP – 350 km/h*
 * Indianapolis

References

External links

 Official website of the 24 Hours of Le Mans
 Spotter Guides – 2008 24 Hours of Le Mans

24 Hours of Le Mans races
Le Mans
24 Hours of Le Mans